Dragojlo is a Serbian masculine given name, derived from the Slavic word drag- ("dear, beloved"). It may refer to:

Dragojlo Stanojlović, Serbian footballer
Bajo Pivljanin, born Dragojlo, hajduk
Dragojlo Dudić (born 1887), Serbian Yugoslav Partisan

See also
Dragojlović, patronymic
Dragojloviće

References

Serbian masculine given names